The first USS Marie (SP-100) was an armed motorboat that served in the United States Navy as a patrol vessel from 1917 to 1919.
 
Marie was built as a civilian motorboat in 1912 by Seabury's at Morris Heights, New York. The U.S. Navy acquired her on 28 April 1917 from her owner, O. M. Pynchon, for use as a patrol boat during World War I. The Navy took delivery of her on 1 May 1917 and commissioned her on 15 June 1917 as USS Marie (SP-100).

Marie was assigned to the section patrol, and performed patrol duty for the remainder of World War I.

On 6 August 1919, Marie was stricken from the Navy List. She was sold on 2 October 1919 to E. J. Steiner.

From October 1917 until January 1919, Marie (SP-100) was one of two U.S. Navy ships in commission with the name USS Marie, the other being patrol boat USS Marie (SP-1260).

References

NavSource Online: Section Patrol Craft Photo Archive: Marie (SP 100)

Patrol vessels of the United States Navy
World War I patrol vessels of the United States
Ships built in Morris Heights, Bronx
1912 ships